Olfactomedin 2, also known as noelin 2, is a protein that in humans is encoded by the OLFM2 gene.

References

Further reading

Olfactomedins